Berane, formerly Ivangrad, is a city located in Montenegro.

Berane, Beranes, Beranci or Berani may also refer to:

Places
Berane Municipality, a municipality whose center is Berane, Montenegro.
Beran Selo, a village located in Berane, Montenegro.
Beranovac, a place located in Kraljevo, Serbia.
Beranci, a village in the Moglia municipality of Macedonia.
Beranes, a place in Spain.
Berani, a place in Pakistan.
Long Beraneh, a place in India.

Other 
 Beranska gimnazija, famous high school in Berane, Montenegro.
 Berane Airport, a disfunt airport in Berane, Montenegro.
 FK Berane, a football club located in Berane, Montenegro.
 RK Berane, a handball club located in Berane, Montenegro.
 Gradski stadion (Berane), a football stadium located in Berane, Montenegro.